Tomlinsons is a village in Saint John Parish, Antigua and Barbuda.

Demographics 
Tomlinsons has two enumeration districts.

 33301  Tomlinsons_1 
 33302  Tomlinsons_2

Census Data (2011)

Individual

Household 
Tomlinsons has 249 households.

References 

Populated places in Antigua and Barbuda
Saint John Parish, Antigua and Barbuda